The 2006–07 Denver Nuggets season was the 40th season of the franchise, 31st in the National Basketball Association (NBA). The season is best remembered when Carmelo Anthony made headlines on December 16 when he was involved in a brawl against the Knicks, and as a result was suspended for 15 games. The next day, the Nuggets acquired Allen Iverson from Philadelphia. Anthony and the newly acquired Iverson played their first game together on January 22, 2007 in a game against Memphis. The Nuggets finished the year at 45-37, making the postseason for the fourth straight year. However, they did not make it out of the first round, losing to the eventual champion San Antonio Spurs in five games. Anthony and Iverson were voted to play in the 2007 NBA All-Star Game although Iverson did not play due to an injury. This was Anthony's first All-Star game appearance.

Draft picks

Roster

Regular season

Season standings

Record vs. opponents

Game log

Playoffs

|- align="center" bgcolor="#ccffcc"
| 1
| April 24
| @ San Antonio
| W 95–89
| Allen Iverson (31)
| Nenê (12)
| Allen Iverson (5)
| AT&T Center18,797
| 1–0
|- align="center" bgcolor="#ffcccc"
| 2
| April 27
| @ San Antonio
| L 88–97
| Carmelo Anthony (26)
| Marcus Camby (18)
| Steve Blake (7)
| AT&T Center18,797
| 1–1
|- align="center" bgcolor="#ffcccc"
| 3
| April 30
| San Antonio
| L 91–96
| Carmelo Anthony (28)
| Carmelo Anthony (12)
| Steve Blake (7)
| Pepsi Center19,951
| 1–2
|- align="center" bgcolor="#ffcccc"
| 4
| May 2
| San Antonio
| L 89–96
| Carmelo Anthony (29)
| Marcus Camby (17)
| Allen Iverson (7)
| Pepsi Center19,644
| 1–3
|- align="center" bgcolor="#ffcccc"
| 5
| May 4
| @ San Antonio
| L 78–93
| Iverson, Anthony (21)
| Marcus Camby (19)
| Allen Iverson (8)
| AT&T Center18,797
| 1–4
|-

Player statistics

Regular season

|-
| 
| 65 || 65 || 38.2 || .476 || .268 || .808 || 6.0 || 3.8 || 1.2 || .4 || style=";"| 28.9
|-
| 
| 49 || 40 || 33.5 || .432 || .343 || .727 || 2.5 || 6.6 || 1.0 || .1 || 8.3
|-
| 
| 31 || 4 || 28.3 || .413 || .373 || .908 || 2.0 || 4.3 || .8 || .1 || 15.2
|-
| 
| 70 || style=";"| 70 || 33.8 || .473 || .000 || .729 || style=";"| 11.7 || 3.2 || 1.2 || style=";"| 3.3 || 11.2
|-
| 
| 2 || 0 || 18.5 || .375 || .000 || . || 1.5 || 5.5 || .0 || .5 || 3.0
|-
| 
| 64 || 19 || 18.4 || .342 || .288 || .660 || 1.7 || .9 || .5 || .1 || 4.4
|-
| 
| 66 || 11 || 17.1 || .544 || . || .497 || 7.0 || .7 || .6 || .2 || 4.9
|-
| 
| 64 || 42 || 26.8 || .570 || .000 || .689 || 7.0 || 1.2 || 1.0 || .9 || 12.2
|-
| 
| 4 || 1 || 9.3 || .400 || . || style=";"| 1.000 || .8 || 2.5 || .8 || .0 || 1.5
|-
| 
| 50 || 49 || style=";"| 42.4 || .454 || .347 || .759 || 3.0 || 7.2 || style=";"| 1.8 || .2 || 24.8
|-
| 
| 39 || 7 || 10.7 || .325 || .216 || .762 || 1.5 || .4 || .4 || .3 || 3.5
|-
| 
| style=";"| 79 || 14 || 18.8 || .422 || .376 || .852 || 3.4 || .6 || .4 || .2 || 7.6
|-
| 
| 2 || 2 || 31.5 || .500 || .000 || .250 || 10.0 || .5 || .0 || .0 || 9.5
|-
| 
| 23 || 23 || 35.7 || .472 || .250 || .729 || 4.5 || style=";"| 9.1 || 1.6 || .2 || 13.0
|-
| 
| 75 || 36 || 22.1 || .576 || .083 || .715 || 4.1 || .9 || 1.0 || .3 || 6.6
|-
| 
| 22 || 3 || 5.7 || style=";"| .643 || .000 || .429 || 2.2 || .2 || .1 || .3 || 1.1
|-
| 
| 63 || 24 || 23.3 || .441 || style=";"| .390 || .810 || 2.3 || 1.4 || .8 || .1 || 13.0
|-
| 
| 11 || 0 || 13.5 || .479 || .000 || .833 || 3.6 || .3 || .5 || .6 || 5.1
|}

Playoffs 

|-
| 
| style=";"| 5 || style=";"| 5 || 42.0 || .480 || style=";"| .500 || .795 || 8.6 || 1.2 || 1.0 || .0 || style=";"| 26.8
|-
| 
| style=";"| 5 || style=";"| 5 || 36.0 || .452 || style=";"| .500 || . || 2.4 || 4.6 || .6 || .0 || 7.2
|-
| 
| style=";"| 5 || style=";"| 5 || 36.8 || .378 || . || .667 || style=";"| 14.8 || 2.0 || .8 || style=";"| 3.2 || 7.6
|-
| 
| 1 || 0 || 14.0 || style=";"| 1.000 || . || .000 || 1.0 || 2.0 || .0 || .0 || 8.0
|-
| 
| 1 || 0 || 1.0 || . || . || . || .0 || .0 || .0 || .0 || .0
|-
| 
| style=";"| 5 || style=";"| 5 || 35.8 || .585 || . || .778 || 7.8 || 2.4 || .6 || .6 || 15.2
|-
| 
| style=";"| 5 || style=";"| 5 || style=";"| 44.6 || .368 || .294 || .806 || .6 || style=";"| 5.8 || style=";"| 1.4 || .0 || 22.8
|-
| 
| style=";"| 5 || 0 || 13.2 || .231 || .167 || .500 || 1.6 || .4 || .0 || .0 || 1.6
|-
| 
| style=";"| 5 || 0 || 19.2 || .235 || .000 || .500 || 5.6 || .4 || .4 || .2 || 1.8
|-
| 
| 4 || 0 || 11.8 || .273 || .000 || style=";"| 1.000 || 2.3 || .5 || 1.0 || .3 || 4.5
|}

Awards and records
 Marcus Camby, NBA Defensive Player of the Year Award
 Carmelo Anthony, All-NBA Third Team
 Marcus Camby, NBA All-Defensive First Team

Transactions

References

Denver Nuggets seasons
Denver Nuggets
Denver Nuggets
Denver Nug